The Sensational Life & Death of Qandeel Baloch is a non-fiction book written by Pakistani journalist Sanam Maher about the life of Qandeel Baloch. The biography book was released on 10 May 2018 and was published by Rupa & Co.

Adaptation 

On 18 May 2022, it reported that Bollywood producer Alankrita Shrivastava who also produced Bombay Begums along with Vikas Sharma purchased the rights of the book to adapt it into a film.

Reception
Firstpost gave a positive review for The Sensational Life & Death of Qandeel Baloch, calling it "a brilliant new book" which "take us to the multiple worlds and lives that Fauzia Waseem lived before and after she became Qandeel Baloch."

DAWN described the book as "meticulously researched" which "presents an engaging social history of Pakistan itself".

The News International review said "This is a must-read book because it immortalizes Qandeel Baloch in the only way she should be: a rebel, a mystery, a beautiful one at that."

The book was featured in HuffPost’s most anticipated books of 2017 in the "non-fiction" category.

References

External links
 http://www.thehindu.com/entertainment/music/qandeel-was-murdered-because-of-peoples-judgement-sanam-maher/article30366539.ece/amp/

2018 non-fiction books
Pakistani biographies
Rupa Publications books
Works about honor killing